Mellow Mama is an album by the American jazz vocalist Dinah Washington, compiling her early recordings from 1945 with Lucky Thompson and His All Stars that were originally issued by Apollo Records. It was released by the Delmark label in 1992.

Reception

AllMusic reviewer Scott Yanow stated: "Recorded in Los Angeles during a three-day period, the 12 selections feature the singer with a swinging jazz combo that has tenor-saxophonist Lucky Thompson, trumpeter Karl George, vibraphonist Milt Jackson and bassist Charles Mingus among its eight members. The 21-year-old Washington was already quite distinctive at this early stage and easily handles the blues and jive material with color and humor. Recommended".

Track listing
All compositions by John Henry except where noted
 "Mellow Mama Blues" (Jessie Mae Robinson) – 3:05
 "All or Nothing Blues" – 2:49
 "Rich Man's Blues" (Thelma Lowe) – 2:51
 "Chewin' Mama Blues" – 2:54
 "Blues for a Day" – 2:49
 "Wise Woman Blues" – 2:46
 "My Voot Is Really Vout" – 3:07
 "Pacific Coast Blues" (Robinson) – 2:37
 "Beggin' Mama Blues" (Wilbert Barranco, Charles Mingus) – 2:49
 "Walking Blues" (Lowe) – 2:38
 "No Voot, No Boot" (Duke Henderson) – 3:00
 "My Lovin' Papa" (Henderson) – 3:02

Personnel
Dinah Washington – vocals
Karl George – trumpet
Jewel Grant – alto saxophone 
Lucky Thompson – tenor saxophone
Gene Porter – baritone saxophone, clarinet
Milt Jackson – vibraphone (tracks 1, 3-7 & 9-12)
Wilbert Baranco – piano
Charles Mingus – bass
Lee Young – drums
Recorded in Los Angeles on December 10, 1945 (tracks 4, 6, 10 & 11), December 12, 1945 (tracks 2, 3, 9 & 12) and December 13, 1945 (tracks 1, 5, 7 & 8)

References

Delmark Records albums
1992 albums
Dinah Washington albums
Albums produced by Bob Koester